North Berwick RFC is a rugby union club based in North Berwick, Scotland.

History

The club was founded in 1952.

Harvey Elms, the Scotland 7s international player stated:
Rugby means a lot to the town. A lot of people are passionate about it. I have very fond memories of growing up playing rugby there. The commitment from the volunteers to coach the kids was very important. It is a place that is recognised for developing players.I have great memories of the North Berwick Sevens, I played in my last year of school and we managed to win it, I remember Lewis Carmichael and I both got the opportunity to play.

Sides

The club runs a 1st XV, a 2nd XV and an over 35s side.

Sevens tournament

The club runs the North Berwick Sevens. They compete for the Stewart Cup.

Their first Sevens tournament was held in 1960.

Honours

Men's

 North Berwick Sevens
 Champions (7):1973, 1981, 1982, 1989, 1997, 2013, 2016
 Edinburgh District Sevens
 Champions (2): 1977, 1979
 Currie Sevens
 Champions (1): 1981

Notable former players

Men

Edinburgh Rugby

The following former North Berwick RFC players have represented Edinburgh Rugby.

Scotland

The following former North Berwick RFC players have represented Scotland.

References

Rugby union in East Lothian
Scottish rugby union teams